Selvam Matriculation Higher Secondary School also known as Selvam School, previously called Barathidasanar Modern School, is a self-financed school run by the Selvam Educational Public Charitable Trust, Arakkonam, India. Selvam School is recognized by the government of Tamil Nadu. The school has classes from Kinder Garden to 12th Standard.

It is located 3 km from Arakkonam Railway Station and 70 km north west off Chennai city.

Curriculum
 Academics: Maths, Science, Social science, as per the Samacheer syllabus.
 Languages: Tamil, English, Hindi - proficiency in Reading, Writing and Speaking.
 Physical Education: Drill, sports, Yogasanas, team games, talent promoting
 Extra-curricular: Music, dance, artwork, handicraft, oratorical skills, leadership skills
 Life skills: Developing good character pleasing  members, good habits, social awareness using personal talents for collective good.

Courses offered
Curriculum - Matric up to 10th std. Medium: English and Tamil

Higher secondary - groups available:
 Physics, Chemistry, Maths, Biology
 Physics, Chemistry, Maths, Computer Science
 Physics, Chemistry, Biology, Computer Science

Clubs and activities
 Tamil, English and Hindi literary clubs
 Science Club
 Mathematics Club
 Project Green Club to create awareness of the environment
 Meditation Club
 Fine Arts Club

Awards
 Best School award 2004 - 2005
 Best School award 2007 - 2008
 Dr. Radhakrishnan award (Best Teacher award) 2008 - 2009, for founder and Chairperson Mr. S. Selvam

External links 
Official website

Primary schools in Tamil Nadu
High schools and secondary schools in Tamil Nadu
Schools in Vellore district